The 1954–55 Nationalliga A season was the 17th season of the Nationalliga A, the top level of ice hockey in Switzerland. Eight teams participated in the league, and EHC Arosa won the championship.

Regular season

Relegation 
 EHC St. Moritz - HC La Chaux-de-Fonds 1:10

External links
 Championnat de Suisse 1954/55

National League (ice hockey) seasons
Swiss
1954–55 in Swiss ice hockey